Arncliffe is a suburb in southern Sydney, in the state of New South Wales, Australia. Arncliffe is located 11 kilometres south of the Sydney central business district, in the local government area of the Bayside Council.

Arncliffe is south of the Cooks River and Wolli Creek, close to Sydney Airport. Arncliffe is a mostly residential area featuring low-density detached and semi-detached houses and some medium density town houses and blocks of flats. There are also some areas of commercial and light industrial developments.

History

Arncliffe's name comes from a small village called Arncliffe in North Yorkshire, England. The name appears in the Domesday Book of 1086, as 'Arneclif', meaning Eagle Cliff. In his book "A Village Called Arncliffe" (1997) Ron Rathbone relates that an early land speculator, William Hirst, created a subdivision in 1840 named The Village of Arncliffe Estate. William Hirst was born in Settle, Yorkshire. Settle is a market town serving a cluster of villages, of which Arncliffe is reputed to be the prettiest. Rathbone says it is likely that Hirst gave Arncliffe its name, although it was more than two decades before it received official recognition.

Alderman E.G. Barton worked to develop the district, including the reclamation  of swampland where Barton Park and Kogarah Golf Links now stand. James Beehag also owned land in the area and later became one of Rockdale's early mayors. In November 1910, a series of lots were auctioned by Ernest V. Broughton. The area, bordered by Wentworth, Cook and Dowling streets was called the 'Radium Estate' and had been surveyed by E. R. Hardy.

Aboriginal culture
The original inhabitants of the area were tribes of Indigenous Australians. There is evidence to suggest that these people belonged to the Gweagal, Bidjigal and Cadigal clans. Valleys of local creeks, Wolli Creek and Bardwell Creek contain evidence of Aboriginal presence in smoke-blackened caves. 

Originally, Arncliffe Hill was known as Cobbler's Hill and the area became the vegetable garden for Sydney. When Hannam's land was subdivided, many new small holdings became farms, spreading towards Black Creek or Muddy Creek. In 1843, newspaper advertisements declared that there was 'money to be made by woodcutters and farming men and persons about Cook's River'. In 1856 another subdivision, Tempe, was described as being close to the village of Arncliffe, described as having "all the characteristics of an English village, being beautifully situated amidst quiet rural scenery, spotted here and there with neat cottages which charm the eye with their pretty, well trimmed gardens, perfect pictures of competence and content".

Athelstane, owned by W.G. Judd, was a notable home in the district. The large house gave its name to the avenue it was built on and later became the site of Athelstane Public School. Another main street, Barden Street, was named after Frederick Barden whose house, Highbery Heights, stood nearby. Arncliffe had many grand and gracious Victorian era houses. Too many have been demolished, or fallen into disrepair, been subdivided and so on, but in the most recent years there have been some attempts to preserve these as part of local heritage. Two-storey semi-detached dwellings, Gladstone and Wentworth on Forest Road, were built by Hurstville builder Robert Newell for rental to 'well to do' tenants. Dappeto on Wollongong Road built in 1885 by oyster merchant Frederick Gibbins, later became a home for children and now houses a Salvation Army chapel, as part of a nursing home and retirement village. 'Belmont' and 'Fairview' are identical Victorian homes built in 1884 by two Irish brothers Thomas and Alexander Milsop, who made their fortunes in the goldfields. 'Meryton' was erected by building contractor Alexander Fell in 1885. 'Coburra' was built in 1905 but was more typical of the earlier Victorian era. Arncliffe Post office is a Federation style building opened in 1906 and originally contained the post master's residence upstairs.

The avenue of trees was planted around 1904. Over the years, Arncliffe has hosted a stinking boiling down works (1870s), a sewerage farm (1886–1916) and various factories and workshops throughout the 20th century, particularly after WW2. These included the Streets Ice Cream factory and Fontana Films, where the film "Jedda" was produced with many of the scenes shot in Arncliffe. Both Streets and Fontana have now closed.

Heritage listings 

Arncliffe has a number of heritage-listed sites, including:
 Firth Street: Arncliffe railway station
 1 Princes Highway (now in Wolli Creek): Tempe House and St Magdalenes Chapel
 Valda Avenue (off south side of Kogarah Golf Course): Western Outfall Main Sewer
 171 Wollongong Road: Dappeto

Commercial area
Arncliffe's main shopping centre is centred around Firth Street and Belmore Street, beside Arncliffe railway station. It also extends part of the way along Forest Road. Shops are also scattered along the length of Wollongong Road towards Bexley. Commercial and light industrial developments are located in the northern parts of the suburb and along the length of the Princes Highway and surrounding streets.

Transport

The Princes Highway runs north towards the city and south towards Rockdale and Kogarah. The other main roads through the suburb are Forest Road and Wollongong Road which run south towards Hurstville. The M5 South Western Motorway runs south-west towards Beverly Hills, Liverpool and north-east towards Botany and the city. A 4 km tunnel runs partly underneath Arncliffe with entrances and exits on Princes Highway and Marsh Street, near the airport.

Arncliffe railway station is on the Illawarra line of the Sydney Trains network.

Arncliffe is also serviced by bus routes 473, 420 and 420N operated by Transit Systems. Route 473 runs from Rockdale, Bardwell Valley, Arncliffe, Turrella station, Earlwood, Clemton Park, and on to Campsie. Route 420 runs from Eastgardens and Mascot to the Sydney Airport terminals, through Arncliffe to Rockdale and on to Burwood. Route 420N is a night version of route 420.

Religion
St David's Anglican Church on Forest Road.
St Francis Xavier's Catholic Church on Forest Road.
Saint Marks Coptic Orthodox Cathedral on Wollongong Road. 
Al-Zahra Mosque at the end of Wollongong Road.
Masjid Darul Imaan Mosque on Eden Street.
Bay City Church on Hattersley Street.

Schools
Arncliffe Public School is located on the corner of Avenal Street and the Princes Highway. Arncliffe Domestic Science Secondary School was formerly located behind the Primary School, on the corner of Avenal Street and Segenhoe Street. 
Athelstane Public School is located on the corner of Wollongong Road and Athelstane Avenue. 
Arncliffe West Infants School on Loftus Street is technically located in the suburb of Turrella. 
St Francis Xavier's Catholic School sits beside the church on Forest Road. 
Al-Zahra College is next to the mosque on Wollongong Road.
Kingdom Culture Christian School sits on the corner of Dowling street.

Parks

Arncliffe Park is the home ground for local teams playing Cricket, Rugby league and Soccer. Cahill Park and Barton Park also provide a number of recreational facilities. Arncliffe War Memorial is located in the middle of Arncliffe Park. Other Parks and recreational facilities include Cahill Park, Barton Park, Kogarah Golf Course.

The site of the former Arncliffe Bowling Club and Bowling Greens in Bonar Street has recently been rezoned for high density residential, along with commercial areas surrounding it. Its close proximity to Arncliffe railway station makes it attractive to developers, who plan to convert this commercial area into high density apartments.

Arncliffe's Earl Park was the home ground of New South Wales Rugby Football League Premiership club, St. George from 1925 to 1939, and was the site of the infamous 1928 Earl Park riot.

Culture

Arncliffe has a number of social venues including:
 Arncliffe RSL
 Arncliffe Scots Sports & Social Club 
 Rowers on Cooks River, formerly the St George Rowing Club
 Kogarah Golf Club

Demographics

Country of Birth: 46.4% of people were born in Australia. The most common countries of birth were China 8.3%, Lebanon 6.1%, Macedonia 3.4%, Philippines 2.0% and New Zealand 1.7%.

Languages: 36.8% of people only spoke English at home. Other languages spoken at home included Arabic 16.6%, Mandarin 12.9%, Macedonian 9.2%, Greek 3.3% and Cantonese 3.0%.

Religion: The most common responses for religion were No Religion 23.9%, Islam 20.0% and Catholic 18.1%

Geography

Wolli Creek and Bardwell Valley
An important community issue is potential overdevelopment, with high-density housing development occurring around the new Wolli Creek railway station. This area in the northern part of Arncliffe officially became the separate suburb of Wolli Creek in 2002.
 
Bardwell Valley was originally a locality beside Bardwell Creek, adjoining the suburb of Bardwell Park. The valley was famous for its golf course and golf club. Bardwell Valley became a new suburb in 1996, formed from parts of Arncliffe that border the valley. Bardwell Park was named after free settler Thomas Hill Bardwell who owned land in the area.

Landmarks
 Arncliffe Railway Station on Firth Street
 Arncliffe Fire Station on West Botany Street
 Arncliffe Library on Firth Street
 Arncliffe Community Centre, Arncliffe YMCA and Coronation Hall on Barden Street
 St George School Education Area Office on Segenhoe Street, beside Arncliffe Public School

References

External links
 Arncliffe Heritage walk

 
Suburbs of Sydney